Brutus is a 1911 Italian silent historical film directed by Enrico Guazzoni and starring Amleto Novelli. The film portrays the life of Marcus Junius Brutus the Younger, one of the assassins of Julius Caesar. The film was moderately successful, but not on the scale of his Quo Vadis the following year which was a major international hit.

References

Bibliography 
 Moliterno, Gino. Historical Dictionary of Italian Cinema. Scarecrow Press, 2008.

External links 
 

1911 films
Italian historical drama films
Italian silent short films
1910s Italian-language films
Films directed by Enrico Guazzoni
1910s historical drama films
Films set in ancient Rome
Depictions of Julius Caesar on film
Cultural depictions of Marcus Junius Brutus
Italian black-and-white films
1911 drama films
Silent historical drama films